Marinobacterium halophilum is a Gram-negative bacterium.

External links
Type strain of Marinobacterium halophilum at BacDive -  the Bacterial Diversity Metadatabase

Alteromonadales
Bacteria described in 2007